Perry Fewell (born September 7, 1962) is an American football coach. He currently serves as the senior vice president of officiating administration for the National Football League's officiating department. Previously, he served as the defensive backs coach or defensive coordinator for eight NFL teams between 1998 and 2019. He also served as the interim head coach for the Buffalo Bills in 2009 and for the Carolina Panthers in 2019.  Fewell won Super Bowl XLVI as the defensive coordinator of the New York Giants, a position he held for five seasons.

Early years
Fewell attended South Point High School in Belmont, North Carolina. In 1979, he helped lead the school to a 3-A state football championship.

College
Fewell attended Lenoir-Rhyne College and was a football standout. In football, he was a four-year letterman and as a senior, he was named the team's Most Improved Player.

Coaching career

College
Fewell was a college coach for 13 years (1985-1997), working as an assistant at North Carolina, Army, Kent State, and Vanderbilt.

Jacksonville Jaguars
Fewell entered the NFL as the defensive backs coach for Tom Coughlin in 1998 and stayed there through 2002.  Jacksonville's pass defense ranked third in the NFL in 1999 and two years later the Jaguars gave up only 13 touchdown passes.

St. Louis Rams
In 2003, Fewell moved to St. Louis, where he was the secondary coach of the Rams.

Chicago Bears
Fewell was a Defensive Backs coach with Chicago from 2004–2005 under Head Coach Lovie Smith.

Buffalo Bills
Fewell was hired as defensive coordinator of the Buffalo Bills in 2006.  In what was statistically their best season under Fewell, the 2008 Bills defense ranked 2nd in the AFC in negative yardage plays, recorded 7 games of holding opposing offenses to less than 100 yards rushing, finished 4th in the NFL in red zone defense (41.8%), and allowed just 14 passing touchdowns all year.

In Week 10 of the 2009 season, the Bills fired head coach Dick Jauron after a 3–6 start and Fewell was appointed interim head coach. He led Buffalo to a 3–4 finish. Following the season finale, the Bills fired their entire coaching staff, including Fewell.

New York Giants
On January 14, 2010, Fewell was hired as defensive coordinator of the New York Giants.  Fewell served under head coach Tom Coughlin, under whom Fewell previously worked during his time with the Jacksonville Jaguars.  On February 5, 2012, the Giants defeated the New England Patriots 21–17 to win Super Bowl XLVI. Under his leadership, the Giants defense was often criticized for being "off and soft", allowing other teams to come back into games they should not have been able to. On January 7, 2015, the Giants and Fewell parted ways after he spent five years in charge of the defense.

Washington Redskins
Fewell served as defensive backs coach for the Washington Redskins for two seasons.

Return to the Jacksonville Jaguars 
After Tom Coughlin returned to the Jacksonville Jaguars as the Executive Vice President of Football Operations, Fewell was brought in to act as the defensive backs coach on Doug Marrone's staff.

Carolina Panthers
Fewell was named the secondary coach of the Carolina Panthers on January 15, 2019. He was named interim head coach on December 3, 2019, following the dismissal of Ron Rivera.

NFL Officiating
In 2020, Fewell joined the NFL's officiating department as Senior Vice President of Officiating Administration.

Head coaching record

* – Interim head coach

References

1962 births
Living people
New York Giants coaches
Buffalo Bills coaches
Buffalo Bills head coaches
Chicago Bears coaches
Jacksonville Jaguars coaches
Washington Redskins coaches
St. Louis Rams coaches
Carolina Panthers coaches
National Football League defensive coordinators
Army Black Knights football coaches
Kent State Golden Flashes football coaches
Lenoir–Rhyne Bears football players
North Carolina Tar Heels football coaches
Vanderbilt Commodores football coaches
People from Belmont, North Carolina
People from Gaston County, North Carolina
African-American coaches of American football
Players of American football from North Carolina
Lenoir–Rhyne University alumni
National Football League executives
Carolina Panthers head coaches